Ceratosoma bicolor is a species of sea slug or dorid nudibranch, a marine gastropod mollusk in the family Chromodorididae. It is possible that this species is a colour variation of Ceratosoma trilobatum

Distribution 
This species was described from Japan.

Description
Anatomically indistinguishable from Ceratosoma trilobatum but with a distinctive colour pattern.

Ecology

References

Chromodorididae
Gastropods described in 1949